Meeting House Green may refer to:

 Meetinghouse Green Historic District, Ipswich, Massachusetts
 The green in Haddam Center Historic District in Connecticut
 Some other specific village green